Bolderogery, New South Wales is a civil parish of Gordon County, New South Wales. a Cadastral divisions of New South Wales. Bolderogery Parish is located between Yeoval, New South Wales and the Little River (Dubbo).

References

Parishes of Gordon County (New South Wales)